The 2021 SMU Mustangs football team represented Southern Methodist University during the 2021 NCAA Division I FBS football season. The Mustangs played their home games at Gerald J. Ford Stadium in University Park, Texas, a separate city within the city limits of Dallas, competed as members of the American Athletic Conference (AAC). The Mustangs were led by fourth-year coach Sonny Dykes—on November 29, it was announced that Dykes would leave the program to become the head coach at TCU. He finished at SMU with an overall record of 30–18.

After finishing their regular season with an 8–4 record, the Mustangs accepted a bid to play in the Fenway Bowl, where they were due to face the Virginia Cavaliers. On December 26, the Cavaliers withdrew from the game, due to COVID-19 issues; the bowl was subsequently canceled.

Previous season
The Mustangs finished the 2020 season 7–3 and 4–3 in The American play to finish in fifth place in the conference. The Mustangs accepted an invitation to the Frisco Bowl, where they were slated to play the UTSA Roadrunners. However, the bowl was subsequently canceled, due to COVID-19 concerns within the SMU football program.

Preseason

Media poll
The American Athletic Conference preseason media poll was released at the virtual media day held August 4, 2021. Cincinnati, who finished the 2020 season ranked No. 8 nationally, was tabbed as the preseason favorite in the 2021 preseason media poll.

Schedule

Personnel

Depth chart

Game summaries

Abilene Christian

North Texas

at Louisiana Tech

at TCU

South Florida

at Navy

Tulane

at Houston

at Memphis

UCF

at No. 5 Cincinnati

Tulsa

Rankings

Weekly awards
The American offensive player of the week
Tanner Mordecai (week 1 vs. Abilene Christian)
Tanner Mordecai (week 3 vs. Louisiana Tech)
Tanner Mordecai (week 8 vs. Tulane)
Tanner Mordecai (week 11 vs. UCF)

The American special teams player of the week
Bryan Massey (week 5 vs. Navy)

References

SMU
SMU Mustangs football seasons
SMU Mustangs football